The Journal of Human Nutrition and Dietetics is a bimonthly peer-reviewed medical journal covering nutrition science as it relates to humans. It was founded in 1982 as Human Nutrition. Applied Nutrition, which was one of two journals that superseded the Journal of Human Nutrition. In 1988, Human Nutrition. Applied Nutrition and Human Nutrition: Clinical Nutrition were combined into the European Journal of Clinical Nutrition, at which point the Journal of Human Nutrition and Dietetics was founded as its own journal. It is published by John Wiley & Sons on behalf of the British Dietetic Association, of which it is the official journal. The editor-in-chief is Simon Langley-Evans (University of Nottingham). Past editors were Pat Judd, Jane Thomas, Joan Gandy and Ailsa Brotherton. According to the Journal Citation Reports, the journal has a 2020 impact factor of 3.089, ranking it 58th out of 89 journals in the category "Nutrition & Dietetics".

References

External links

Publications established in 1982
Nutrition and dietetics journals
Wiley (publisher) academic journals
Bimonthly journals
English-language journals
Academic journals associated with learned and professional societies of the United Kingdom